The Hundvåg Tunnel is a road tunnel in Stavanger municipality in Rogaland county, Norway. The tunnel goes under the Byfjorden and it connects the mainland of the city of Stavanger and the island of Hundvåg. The tunnel is part of the Ryfast tunnel network that opened in 2019. The western end of the tunnel connects to the Eiganes Tunnel in the city of Stavanger. Near the eastern end of the tunnel, there is an exit to the island of Buøy as well. The tunnel exits on the island of Hundvåg, just a short distance from the entrance to the Ryfylke Tunnel, a much longer tunnel crossing the fjord to Ryfylke.

References

Stavanger
Road tunnels in Rogaland